Lippincott Mountain is a mountain summit with an elevation of , located on the Great Western Divide of the Sierra Nevada mountain range, in Tulare County of northern California. Lippincott Mountain ranks as the 351st highest summit in California. The High Sierra Trail traverses below the eastern slope of this mountain, providing an approach option.

History
This mountain's name was officially adopted in 1928 by the United States Board on Geographic Names to honor Joseph Barlow Lippincott (1864–1942), hydrographer for the United States Geological Survey and the United States Reclamation Service, from 1894 to 1904. Lippincott had a role in the California water wars and construction of the Los Angeles Aqueduct which diverted water from the Owens Valley to Los Angeles. The first ascent of the summit was made in 1922 by Norman Clyde, who is credited with 130 first ascents, most of which were in the Sierra Nevada.

Climate
According to the Köppen climate classification system, Lippincott Mountain is located in an alpine climate zone. Most weather fronts originate in the Pacific Ocean, and travel east toward the Sierra Nevada mountains. As fronts approach, they are forced upward by the peaks, causing them to drop their moisture in the form of rain or snowfall onto the range (orographic lift). Precipitation runoff from the  mountain drains west into tributaries of Kaweah River, and east to Big Arroyo, which is a tributary of the Kern River.

See also
 List of mountain peaks of California

Gallery

References

External links

 Weather forecast: Lippincott Mountain
 Joseph Barlow Lippincott biography

Mountains of Tulare County, California
Mountains of Sequoia National Park
North American 3000 m summits
Mountains of Northern California
Sierra Nevada (United States)